Johann Mouse is a 1953 American one-reel animated cartoon and the 75th Tom and Jerry cartoon, released in theaters on March 21, 1953 by Metro-Goldwyn-Mayer. The short is directed by William Hanna and Joseph Barbera, composed by Scott Bradley, and animated by Kenneth Muse, Ray Patterson, Ed Barge, and Irven Spence. It won the 1952 Academy Award for Best Short Subject: Cartoons, the seventh and last Oscar given to a Tom and Jerry short.

Plot
In 19th century Vienna, Tom Cat and Johann Mouse played by Jerry Mouse live in the house of composer Johann Strauss. Whenever Strauss plays the piano, Johann comes out of his hole to dance to the music, and Tom will repeatedly try to catch him to no avail. One day, Strauss goes away on a journey, much to Tom's dismay. Tom realizes that the key to catching Johann would be through music, so he begins teaching himself how to play the piano using Strauss' written tutorial, "How to Play the Waltz in Six Easy Lessons." As Tom plays the piano, he is able to lure out and capture Johann, but his playing is immediately praised by the house servants, and so he lets go of Johann and happily continues his performance.

Tom's piano playing and Johann's dancing spread by word-of-mouth across Vienna, eventually reaching the Emperor of Austria. Tom and Johann are then commanded to perform at the palace before the emperor. Tom and Johann perform with vigor and delight at the palace, but Tom eventually succumbs to his instincts and tries to chase after Johann, only to fail once again and making the audience clap once again.

Production
As with every short of Tom and Jerry during its first two decades, Johann Mouse is directed by William Hanna and Joseph Barbera, with its score composed by Scott Bradley. The piano arrangements for the short was created and played by Jakob Gimpel, a Polish-born concert pianist. Within the Tom and Jerry series, Johann Mouse is unique for having a record album directly adapted from the short itself, released in May 1953 and with Bret Morrison substituting Hans Conried as narrator.

Reception
Ben Simon of Animated Views praised Johann Mouse for its "extraordinarily exquisite watercolor production values", and noted that Hans Conried was "having fun as the narrator". Writer and historian Michael Samerdyke considered the short to be "simply adorable", and observed that continues "Tom and Jerrys romance with classic music." Samerdyke also wrote that the short has "a lovely, bittersweet feel. The storybook narration and the darling action is all sweet, but beneath it all lies the awareness that the world of Strauss waltzes and their elegance is over."

Joseph Barbera later considered Johann Mouse, alongside The Cat Concerto, to be his favorite Tom and Jerry cartoon.

Home media
"Tom & Jerry Cartoon Festival Featuring Academy Award Winner Johann Mouse" (1985)
"Tom & Jerrys 50th Birthday Classics III" (1990)
"Tom and Jerrys Greatest Chases, Vol. 1" (2000)
"Tom and Jerry Spotlight Collection" (2004)
"Warner Bros. Home Entertainment Academy Awards Animation Collection: 15 Winners" (2008)
"Warner Bros. Home Entertainment Academy Awards Animation Collection: 15 Winners - 26 Nominees" (2008)
"Tom & Jerry: Deluxe Anniversary Collection" (2010)

References

External links

Johann Mouse at the TCM Movie Database

1953 films
1953 short films
1950s American animated films
1950s animated short films
1953 comedy films
1950s fantasy films
1950s musical films
1953 animated films
American musical comedy films
Animated films about music and musicians
Best Animated Short Academy Award winners
Cultural depictions of Johann Strauss I
Cultural depictions of Johann Strauss II
Films scored by Scott Bradley
Films set in the 19th century
Films set in Vienna
American musical fantasy films
Short films directed by Joseph Barbera
Short films directed by William Hanna
Tom and Jerry short films
Films produced by Fred Quimby
Metro-Goldwyn-Mayer cartoon studio short films
1950s English-language films